Ramadan Sewehli, also spelt as Ramadan al-Suwayhili, ( Ramaḍān as-Swīḥlī) (c. 1879 – 1920) was a prominent Tripolitanian nationalist at the outset of the Italian occupation in 1911 and one of the founders of the Tripolitanian Republic.

He fought for the Ottoman cause against the Italians did during the Italo-Turkish War, but after the conclusion of the 1912 peace treaty, he led a revolt against an Italian column at Sirte. With outbreak of World War I, the Italians withdrew from Misrata. Seeing the advantage, he later took part in the battle of Gasr Bu Hadi against the Italians. For several years, he succeeded of strengthening the town of Misrata as a safe haven for Ottoman forces and an autonomous political district. In 1916, his troops clashed with Senussi forces sent to Sirte to collect taxes from the local population.  He is an ancestor of Abdulrahman Sewehli.

References

Libyan Muslims
Libyan people of Turkish descent
People from Misrata